The 2002 Artistic Gymnastics World Cup Final was held in Stuttgart, Germany in 2002. This was the third edition of the World Cup Final. From 2001 to 2002, a series of qualifying events were held, culminating in a final event, the World Cup Final. The different stages, sometimes referred to as World Cup Qualifiers, mostly served the purpose of awarding points to individual gymnasts and groups according to their placements. These points would be added up over the two-year period to qualify a limited number of athletes to the biennial World Cup Final event.

Medal winners

References

2002
Artistic Gymnastics World Cup
International gymnastics competitions hosted by Germany
2002 in German sport